The J. N. "Ding" Darling National Wildlife Refuge is part of the United States National Wildlife Refuge System, located in southwestern Florida on Sanibel Island in the Gulf of Mexico. "Ding" Darling Wildlife Society (DDWS), a non-profit Friends of the Refuge organization, supports environmental education and services at the J.N. "Ding" Darling National Wildlife Refuge. It is named after the cartoonist Jay Norwood "Ding" Darling.

History and description 
The 5200 acre (21 km2) refuge was established in 1976, to protect one of the country's largest undeveloped mangrove ecosystems. 

The J. N. "Ding" Darling National Wildlife Refuge Complex consists of the following: the Darling Refuge itself, and the Caloosahatchee, Island Bay, Matlacha, and Pine Island National Wildlife Refuges.

The northern section of the refuge is in the J.N. Ding Darling Wilderness Area, which was created in 1976 and currently protects  or 41% of the refuge.

The refuge is well known for its migratory bird populations and birdwatching opportunities. It also home to raccoons, bobcats, river otters, alligators, and marsh rabbits.

Climate impacts 
Hurricane Charley struck the refuge on August 13, 2004, causing major changes to the topography and ecology. 

Sea level rise has increased beach erosion on the barrier islands which protect Ding Darling's manatee habitat. Rising temperatures are increasing the ratio of female hatchlings of Ding Darling's endangered Florida loggerhead turtle population. The refuge's American alligator population is decreasing, due to increased salinity and a reduction of the freshwater flow in its mangroves.

References

External links

 J.N. 'Ding' Darling National Wildlife Refuge at  U.S. Fish and Wildlife Service
 'Ding' Darling Wildlife Society
 J.N. 'Ding' Darling National Wildlife Refuge  at  J. N. 'Ding' Darling Foundation
 J.N. 'Ding' Darling National Wildlife Refuge at Florida Fish and Wildlife Conservation Commission
 J.N. 'Ding' Darling National Wildlife Refuge at Gorp.com

IUCN Category Ib
Protected areas of Lee County, Florida
National Wildlife Refuges in Florida
Wilderness areas of Florida
Protected areas established in 1976
Nature centers in Florida
Sanibel, Florida
1976 establishments in Florida